First Essex is a bus company operating services in the county of Essex. It is a subsidiary of FirstGroup.

History

First Essex arose from an amalgamation of Eastern National and Thamesway Buses. First Essex was originally part of the Eastern National Omnibus Company, founded in 1929, nationalised in 1949 and privatised in a management buyout in October 1986. In 1990, Eastern National was sold to Badgerline (who became part of FirstGroup in 1995) and split - the depots in North Essex continuing to operate as Eastern National and those in South Essex being transferred to a new division, Thamesway. Both were later amalgamated again and rebranded First Essex.

First Essex was criticised by passengers and members of the Southend Area Bus Users' Group for withdrawing services which it considered no longer economically viable when Southend Borough Council withdrew bus subsidies as part of budget cuts in 2005. First said it was due to low passenger numbers, even when parts of the route were profitable. Further criticism came from passengers when First Essex and Arriva Southend decided to withdraw their "Day Rover" ticket, which allowed unlimited journeys on the day of purchase on buses operated by both companies, regardless of which company issued the ticket, so that day tickets could only be used on the buses of the company that issued them. They replaced it with a more expensive "Octopus" ticket, issued by and can be used on any buses operated by companies running in the general Southend area.

Current depots

First Essex operates four bus depots in the cities of Chelmsford and Colchester, and the towns of Basildon  and Hadleigh. The outstation at Great Dunmow has closed, with services transferring to Chelmsford depot. Harwich depot was closed in late 2013; its services are now either run by Colchester depot or have changed operators to Hedingham & Chambers. The Braintree depot was closed in late 2015; all of its services are now either run by Stephensons of Essex (21, 30, 131, 132 - converted to 38/38A) or by the Chelmsford depot (70, 352).

Basildon (BN)
Basildon garage operates routes B1, B2, B3, B4, B5, 100, 200, 300, 1A, 9, 16, 104, 106, 552, X10 Essex Airlink, 21 (Saturdays only), 25,251 and school services 561/A, 625, 725, 825.

History
Basildon depot is located on Cherrydown East, near to Basildon railway station. It was opened by Eastern National in 1961 to replace premises at Bull Road, Vange.

After Brentwood depot closed in 1995, Basildon ran the Brentwood town services until 1998, when they were transferred to Harold Wood depot. When First London took over Harold Wood in 2004, Basildon again took on the Brentwood town services until 2012, when Chelmsford acquiredthe Brentwood services with the 351 and 73 (Basildon renumbered the 551 to service 9).

Chelmsford (CF)
Chelmsford depot operates routes 13/13A, 14, X30 Essex Airlink, 31/B/C/D/X, 32, 35, 36/A/B/X, 37, 40, 42/A/B, 45/A/C, 46, 47, 51, 54/A/C 56/A/B/C 57/A/B/C, 70, 71/A/B/C/D/X/, 72, 73/A, 80A/C, 94C/D, 350/351, 565 and school bus services 525, 570, 620.

37, 80A/C and 565 are Brentwood town services.

History
When the old Duke Street bus depot/bus station was demolished in autumn 2004, operations moved to a new site at Westway. The site was redeveloped, with a new and much reduced bus station opening in March 2007.

Chelmsford had outstations at Great Dunmow and Maldon until 2004. Maldon had previously been a full depot until 1993, with the MN code.

On 20 October 2013, Chelmsford took over the operation of route 888 Luton Airport shuttle from First Northampton.

From its opening in 2007 until 2022, it had been the operator of the Chelmsford Park and Ride service; the contract was lost to Vectare.

Colchester (CR)
Colchester depot operates routes 1A (Sundays & evenings), 2A (Sundays & evenings), 17 (school days), 61, 62/A/B, 64/A, 65, 66/B, 67, 68, 70 (some journeys), 71/X (some journeys), 75/75A, 88/A/B, 99, 100, 102, 103, 104, 106, 174 & 175.

History
The garage in Quayside is the main garage in Colchester. It was built in 2016 to replace the old garage on Queen Street, which was on the site of the Theatre Royal that burned down circa 1917. Buses were kept in the old Colchester Corporation tram shed at Magdalen Street after it was vacated by Network Colchester in 2006. This ceased in July 2009 when the yard next door was used instead, also previously occupied by Network Colchester. First had another Colchester site at Haven Road, which was mainly used for engineering. This has since been bought by a local company that is not transport orientated; in 2015, First demolished the old timber yard (its former use) and built a new bus garage.

Until 1973, Eastern National had a one bus outstation at West Mersea, acquired from Primrose Bus Service in 1935. The building there survive, but, in 1979, it was heavily modified to become part of a new leisure centre. Service buses still terminate outside and locals still refer to it as West Mersea bus station.

Until 1969, Eastern National also had a one bus outstation in Victoria Place, Brightlingsea. This was acquired with the business of Berry & Sons in 1937.
First Essex in Colchester no longer operates the 99,100 or 106.

Hadleigh (HH)
Hadleigh garage operates routes: 20, 21/C, 22, 27/A,63, 28 and school services 820, 822 and 827.

History
Hadleigh garage is located on London Road, just west of Hadleigh shopping centre. It is a former Westcliff on Sea Motor Services depot, controlled by Eastern National from 1955.

Hadleigh took on the work of Canvey (CY) depot in April 1978. Canvey has since become a transport museum.

Hadleigh further expanded its operations in 1992, after Southend (Prittlewell, PL) depot was closed. The predecessor of Prittlewell, Southend (SD) depot on London Road, closed in 1987 and has now disappeared under a Sainsbury's store.

Former depots

Braintree (BE)
Braintree garage operated routes X32, 17, 21/A, 30, 70, 131, 132, 302, 306, 318, 347 and yellow school bus service 509.

History
The former depot, on Springwood Drive, opened in April 2005. It replaced the long-standing premises on Fairfield Road, in Braintree town centre, which was redeveloped for retail/residential use.

Springwood Drive was originally an outstation of Chelmsford, consisting of a secure yard and portakabin. There were vehicle washing facilities and fuelling, but heavy maintenance was done at Chelmsford. The portakabin had previously been at the Maldon outstation (closed 2004).

In 2009, First re-opened a full depot in Braintree, behind the secure yard in Springwood Drive. This contained washing/fuelling facilities and heavy maintenance facilities, while the Secure Yard now houses the 'reserve' fleet.

Fairfield Road had originally been used by Hicks Brothers, a bus operator which Eastern National took over in 1949. A house adjacent to the old depot site survives, to remind us of a link with the Hicks era.

Clacton (CN)
Clacton depot operated routes 5/B, 7/X, 8, 10, 11, 12, 17, 18, 74, 76 and former Harwich depot routes 3, 4, 20/A & 22A/B.

History
Clacton depot has been at Telford Road, on the Gorse Lane industrial estate, since 1988 at premises previously occupied by Coastal Red, a one-time competitor on the Tendring peninsular later bought by Eastern National. Telford Road replaced the garage at Castle Road, near Clacton town centre, which was redeveloped as flats.

There was an outstation of Clacton at Walton-on-the-Naze, until May 1996. This was a small garage at Kino Road, just off the seafront, and housed 4 vehicles. Walton had the depot code of WN and was demolished in 1998, with bungalows built on the site. However, the enquiry office survives as a gift shop.

The predecessor of Walton garage was Warners Iron Foundry at Naze Park Road, a building stands to this day. This had its origins with Silver Queen.

The depot closed on Saturday 28 July 2018.

Great Dunmow (DW)
This outstation operated route 33.

History
Dunmow was an outstation of Braintree. It reopened in 2008, having been closed in 2004, after the new Chelmsford depot opened. It is located on the premises of Dons Coaches.

Harwich (DT)

Harwich garage formerly ran routes 3, 4, 20/A, 22A/B, 103, 104 and school services 193 & C30. The depot closed in December 2013; services 3, 4, 20/A, 22A/B were transferred to Clacton depot and services 103, 104 are now operated from Colchester. First previously continued to use the site to park buses overnight for the early morning 103/104 services, however buses now return to Colchester depot at night.

History
The depot at Harwich Bus Station, off Main Road, was opened by Eastern National in 1974. It replaced the old Dovercourt depot at Kingsway, whose building is now used as a public library. The DT depot code (for Dovercourt) was retained for the new premises.

Fleet
As at December 2020, the fleet consisted of 334 buses 

Current fleet:
Transbus Trident ALX400
Dennis Trident 2/Plaxton President
Volvo B7TL/ALX400
Volvo B7TL/Wright Eclipse Gemini
Alexander Dennis Enviro 400
Alexander Dennis Enviro400 MMC
Volvo B9TL/Wright Eclipse Gemini 2
Scania N250UD/Alexander Dennis Enviro400 MMC
Dennis Dart SLF/Plaxton Pointer 2
Alexander Dennis Enviro 200
Alexander Dennis Enviro 300
Alexander Dennis Enviro350H
Alexander Dennis Enviro 200 MMC
Volvo B7RLE/Wright Eclipse Urban
Volvo B7RLE/Wright Eclipse 2
Volvo 7900 Hybrid
Wright StreetLite DF
Wright StreetLite Max

References

External links

Company website
HarlowRide – Harlow Travel Information

FirstGroup bus operators in England
Transport in the City of Chelmsford
Transport in Harlow
Bus operators in Essex